Ryan Hamilton is an American stand-up comedian who uses observational, sarcastic, and self-deprecating humor.  He is known as a clean comedian and his material focuses on his own experiences, including his single life, skydiving, hot air balloons, and his huge smile. He was named one of Rolling Stones Five Comics to Watch in 2012, and also has made standout appearances on The Tonight Show Starring Jimmy Fallon, The Late Show with Stephen Colbert, Conan, The Late Late Show, Last Comic Standing, Comedy Central, and Showtime.

Early life
Hamilton was born in 1976 in Ashton, Idaho, a small potato farming community. He attended BYU-Idaho, receiving an associate degree in journalism and public relations. He then transferred to Brigham Young University and earned a bachelor's degree in public relations.

Stand-up comedy career
Ryan started performing in Salt Lake City, Utah clubs. He also lived and performed in Seattle and performed often in Boston, all of which he considers his "comedy homes".  He has appeared in several festivals and competitions including winning the Sierra Mist "America's Next Great Comic" search in 2005 and joining their national tour.  In 2011 he won The Great American Comedy Festival. He has also been a regular performer at the Just for Laughs Comedy festivals, including Montreal and Sydney, and was a two-time semi-finalist on Last Comic Standing.  He's also made appearances performing stand-up on Conan, Comedy Central, and Showtime. Recently he opened for Jerry Seinfeld on his 2019 Live tour.

Ryan's first 1-hour special, Happy Face, became available on Netflix on August 29, 2017.

Filmography

Personal life
Hamilton resides in New York City. In January of 2022, Ryan was hit by a shuttle bus as a pedestrian in Los Angeles at LAX airport, and suffered ten broken ribs, a compound fractured arm that required surgery, and a punctured collapsed lung. He recovered at his family home in Idaho.

References

External links
 Ryan Hamilton's official site

American stand-up comedians
Living people
Brigham Young University–Idaho alumni
People from Fremont County, Idaho
1976 births
21st-century American comedians